Clostridium homopropionicum is a strictly anaerobic bacterium from the genus Clostridium which has been isolated from sewage sludge in Germany.

References

 

Bacteria described in 1991
homopropionicum